Takeover is a 1988 Australian film directed by Robert Marchand and starring Barry Otto, Anne Tenney, and Paul Chubb. The film is about George Oppenheimer, a computer inventor.

References

External links

Takeover at AustLit
Takeover at Ozmovies

1988 television films
1988 films
Australian television films
1980s English-language films
Films directed by Robert Marchand